Renaissance Hotels is a luxury hotel brand of Marriott International. It was founded in 1981 as Ramada Renaissance, an upscale brand of Ramada Inns. In 1989 the brand was relaunched as Renaissance Hotels. It was bought by Marriott in 1997. As of June 30, 2020, it has 176 hotels with 55,501 rooms, in addition to 29 hotels with 7,613 rooms in the pipeline.

History

Renaissance Hotels was founded in 1981 as Ramada Renaissance, an upscale division of Ramada Inns. The first property was located in Aurora, Colorado, outside Denver. Ramada Inc Hotels & restaurants were sold to Hong Kong-based New World Development Ltd. in 1989 for $540 million. New World divided the Renaissance Hotels brand into a separate chain and developed Renaissance & Ramada as independent hotel brands. (the U.S. rights to the Ramada name were sold to Prime Hospitality), and the former Ramada Corp. was renamed Aztar Corp.

In 1993, New World purchased the Stouffer Hotels chain from Nestle for an estimated $1.5 Billion, New World secured the rights to use the Stouffer name for 3 years during a transitional period. The former Stouffer Hotels were branded as Stouffer Renaissance Hotels until 1996, when the Stouffer branding was retired and the properties became Renaissance Hotels.

On September 27, 1995, New World Development (NWD), took their management and franchising company public (listing on the New York Stock Exchange) and become Renaissance Hotel Group N.V.. New World retained ownership of many of the individual hotel structures through CTF Holdings, a private company owned by the Cheng family, the owner of NWD group. Some hotel buildings, however, remained as the property of the NWD group, such as Renaissance Harbour View Hotel of the Hong Kong Convention and Exhibition Centre complex.

On February 18, 1997 Marriott International bought Renaissance Hotel Group N.V. for US$1 billion from NWD. The Ramada International brand was included in the acquisition. In September 2004, Marriott sold the Ramada International brand to Cendant Corp. (today known as Wyndham).

Accommodations

Historical

From 2015

Properties and locations

The Ramada Renaissance brand began with large hotels in major urban centers. However, as Marriott has decided to expand their "lifestyle" collection, including the Renaissance brand, the hotels can be found in 176 locations globally.

See also
 Rosewood Hotel Group, another hotel group, established by Renaissance Hotels former owner New World Development

References

External links
 

 
Marriott International brands
Hotels established in 1981
1981 establishments in the United States
Former New World Development subsidiaries